Inside Retail is an International trade magazine and websites for the retailing industry, published by Octomedia.

It started as Inside Retail Weekly, launched as a printed weekly newspaper back in the early 1970s in Australia followed by a bi-monthly magazine and a free internet website in June 2006.

In 2014 Inside Retail launched Inside Retail NZ following the Australian success covering New Zealand Retail News and later in 2015 also launched in Asia in general as well as Hong Kong and Singapore.

Throughout the day they publish retail news, intelligence and analysis, facilitating and informing the retail industry in various locations around the world.

References

External links
 Inside Retail Australia
 Inside Retail New Zealand
 Inside Retail Hong Kong

2005 establishments in Australia
Business magazines published in Australia
Free magazines
Magazines established in 2005
Monthly magazines published in Australia
Professional and trade magazines
Weekly magazines published in Australia